Gurung, also known as Tamu Kyi or Tamu Bhaasaa, is a language spoken by the Gurung people of Nepal. The total number of all Gurung speakers in Nepal was 227,918 in 1991 and 325,622 in 2011.

The official language of Nepal, Nepali, is an Indo-European language, whereas Gurung is a Sino-Tibetan language. Gurung is one of the major languages of Nepal, and is also spoken in India, Bhutan, and by diaspora communities in countries such as Singapore and Hong Kong.

Geographical distribution
Gurung is spoken in the following districts of Nepal and India (Ethnologue):

Gandaki Province: Kaski District, Syangja District, Lamjung District, Tanahu District, Gorkha District, Manang District and Mustang
Dhawalagiri Zone: Parbat district
Sikkim: South Sikkim, West Sikkim, East Sikkim

Classification 
At higher levels, Gurung is a member of the Tibeto-Burman (or Trans-Himalayan) family. Robert Shafer classified Gurung within the Bodic division, sub-grouping that into Bodish and West Central Himalayish. Within the Bodish "Section", he located "Bodish" languages (including the Tibetan varieties) and also the "Gurung Branch", including Gurung, Tamang (Murmi), and Thakali (Thaksya). Based on lexical cognates established by Shafer and updated by George van Driem, Shafer constructed the Bodish sub-grouping into three sub-divisions: (1) Western, (2) Central and Southern (a.k.a. “old Bodish”, including Tibetan), and (3) Eastern (containing “archaic” languages like Mönpa) and mainstream languages. Noonan referred to the Western sub-grouping within Bodish as Manange/Nyeshangte and Nar-Phu and Gurungic (containing Gurung, Thakali and Chantyal). He noted that Chantyal is structurally deviant due to more extensive contact-induced language change from Nepali.  Sten Konow classified Himalayan T-B languages into pronominalized and non-prominalized, where Gurung is located. This classification is similar to Voeglin & Voeglin (1965), but within a "Gyarung-Mishmi" sub-family within Sino-Tibetan.

Grammar
Phonetically, Gurung languages are tonal.

Some miscellaneous grammatical features of the Gurung languages are:
 CV, CCV, CCCV syllables
 Maximum of three suffixes
 SOV
 Postpositions
 Grammatical case expressed with preposition
 Genitives
 Adjectives and relatives before head noun
 Numerals after head
 Rising intonation in bipolar questions
 Prefix on negative verbs
 No subject or object agreement in verbs
 Split ergativity based on tense
 Causatives
 Benefactives

Writing system 
For indigenous languages of Nepal, including Gurung, the rise of pluralism and ethnic consciousness has resulted in movements to develop and deploy community orthographies, but it has also resulted in variation and disagreements.

As Noonan (2005) reports, in Gurung, writing primarily has been done through the medium of another language, and so community orthographies tend to be based on pre-existing models of languages of wider communication. According to Glover (2004), attempts at developing an orthography in Gurung go back to 1976, with work to compile the first dictionary of the language. Glover describes the different scripts that have been under consideration by the community, each with their own potential benefits and challenges. Four scripts have been proposed: a system based on the Tibetan script, Devanagari, a Khemaa lipi script (also known as Tamu Khema Phri or Khema Phri), which is a unique alphasyllabary adaptation of Tibetan and Devanagari, and a Romanized script. Glover reported that a plan was in place in 2002 for a forthcoming dictionary of Gurung which included both an (adapted) Devanagari script and also a Roman script, benefitting both literate Gurungs in Nepal and diaspora Gurungs (28-29).

Examples of Gurung language publications that employ orthographies include three books published by Tamu. These use a modified Devanagari orthography, which include subscript dots for nasalized vowels and other special symbols for consonant clusters and tonal and phonation distinctions that are found in Gurung, but not in Nepali. Also included is a 2000 Gurung-Nepali-English dictionary produced by the Tamu Bauddha Sewa Samiti Nepal (Gurung Culture Organization), which also uses a modified Devanagari, and which also includes numerals (e.g., मी1 // 'eye' vs. मी2 // 'name') to indicate tone category for individual words. A 2020 Gurung-English-Nepali dictionary, based on the Sikkim variety of Gurung also makes use of a modified Devanagari script, but does not indicate tone.

See also
Languages of Nepal
Languages of Bhutan

References

Bibliography 
 J. Burton-Page. (1955). Two studies in Gurungkura: I. tone; II. Rhotacization and retroflexion. Bulletin of the Society of Oriental and African Studies 111–19.
 Viktor S.Doherty. (1974). "The Organizing Principles of Gurung Kinship." Kailash. 2.4: 273–301.
 Warren W. Glover. (1970). Gurung tone and higher levels. Occasional Papers of the Wolfenden society on Tibeto-Burman Linguistics III, Tone systems of Tibeto-Burman languages of Nepal, Pt. I, ed. by Austin Hale and Kenneth L. Pike, 52–73. Studies in tone and phonological segments. Urbana: University of Illinois.
 Warren W. Glover. (1974). Sememic and Grammatical Structures in Gurung (Nepal). Publication No. 49. Norman, OK: SIL Publications.
 Warren W. Glover and Jessie Glover. (1972). A Guide to Gurung Tone. Kathmandu: Tribhuvan University and Summer Institute of Linguistics.
 Warren W. Glover and John K. Landon. (1980). "Gurung Dialects." In Papers in Southeast Asian Languages No. 7, edited by R.L. Trail et al., 9-77. Canberra: Pacific Linguistics.
 Kristine A. Hildebrandt, D.N. Dhakal, Oliver Bond, Matt Vallejo and Andrea Fyffe. (2015). “A sociolinguistic survey of the languages of Manang, Nepal: Co-existence and endangerment.” NFDIN Journal, 14.6: 104–122.
 Pettigrew, Judith. (1999). "Parallel Landscapes: Ritual and Political Values of a Shamanic Soul Journey" in Himalayan Space: Cultural Horizons and Practices, edited by Balthasar Bickel and Martin Gaenszle, 247–271. Zürich: Völkerkundsmuseum

External links 

Manang Language Project of Kristine A. Hildebrandt
Manange, Western Gurung at Language Archive at the University of Virginia's Tibetan and Himalayan Library

Languages of Nepal
Languages of Bhutan
Tamangic languages
Languages of Sikkim
Languages of Bagmati Province
Languages of Gandaki Province